Darrell Dean Johnson (August 25, 1928 – May 3, 2004) was an American Major League Baseball catcher, coach, manager and scout. As a manager, he led the 1975 Boston Red Sox to the American League pennant, and was named "Manager of the Year" by both The Sporting News and the Associated Press.

Playing career
Johnson was born in Horace, Nebraska, and graduated from Harvard, Nebraska, High School in 1944. He was signed by the St. Louis Browns as an amateur free agent in 1949 and made his Major League debut with the Browns on April 20, 1952. A reserve catcher during his six-year Major League career (–; –), Johnson also played for the Chicago White Sox, New York Yankees, St. Louis Cardinals, Philadelphia Phillies, Cincinnati Reds and Baltimore Orioles, who released him on June 12, 1962, ending his playing career. In 134 MLB games played, he batted .234 lifetime, with his 75 hits including six doubles, one triple and two home runs.

Johnson's playing career was interrupted by an eleven-month stint as an MLB coach with the St. Louis Cardinals in 1960–1961. When the Redbirds fired Hemus on July 6, 1961, Johnson was released along with him. Three days later, he signed a player's contract with the last-place Philadelphia Phillies and caught 21 games for them in five weeks before being sold to the pennant-contending Cincinnati Reds on August 14.

The Reds were then  games behind the first-place Los Angeles Dodgers, but over the final six weeks of the season they overtook the Dodgers to win the National League championship by four full contests. Johnson appeared in 20 games (including 17 as the club's starting catcher, with the Reds going 8–9). In limited duty, he batted .315 with 17 hits, including his second and last big-league home run, hit off the Dodgers' Johnny Podres on August 16. He appeared in the 1961 World Series against his former team, the Yankees, and had two singles in four at bats (both of them off Baseball Hall of Famer Whitey Ford) as the Reds lost to the slugging Yanks of Roger Maris and Mickey Mantle, four games to one. He started Games 1 and 4, both of them Cincinnati defeats.

The Reds released Johnson only a few days into the 1962 season, and he signed with the Orioles as a backup catcher before retiring as a player in June and serving out the year as Baltimore's bullpen coach.

Manager of Red Sox, Mariners and Rangers

Overview
He then became a minor league manager in the Orioles system and won championships with the Rochester Red Wings of the Triple-A International League in 1964 and Elmira Pioneers of the Double-A Eastern League in 1966. His demotion was the result of an exchange requested by Red Wings president Morrie Silver, who was disappointed with a losing 1965 campaign and wanted the Pioneers' Earl Weaver, coming off a winning season, to manage his team instead. 

After a year spent scouting for the 1967 Yankees, Johnson was named pitching coach of the Boston Red Sox on October 31, succeeding Sal Maglie who had been released after the World Series. When manager Dick Williams was fired in September , Johnson was retained by the Red Sox as a scout in 1970, then managed Boston's Louisville Colonels International League affiliate in 1971–72. In 1973, he became the first manager of the Triple-A Pawtucket Red Sox, finishing 78–68 and winning his second Governors' Cup, emblematic of the International League's playoff championship, in his only PawSox season. That championship earned him a promotion to the parent club as Red Sox manager.

As a big-league manager, Johnson led three different teams over eight seasons. His career began when he succeeded Eddie Kasko following the conclusion of the Red Sox's 1973 campaign on September 30. His biggest success came during his Red Sox posting when he compiled a win–loss record of 220–188 for a .539 winning percentage. The Sox then swept the three-time defending world champion Oakland Athletics in the playoffs, 3–0, to win the American League pennant. But they lost to the Cincinnati "Big Red Machine" in the thrilling 1975 World Series, four games to three. In an interview conducted by Tim Russert on CNBC in 2003, Baseball Hall of Fame catcher Carlton Fisk named Johnson as the biggest influence in his professional life.  

In , Boston started poorly, losing 15 of its first 21 games, then rallied and finally climbed above the .500 mark on July 6 (38–37). As the incumbent pennant-winning manager, Johnson skippered the 1976 American League All-Star team (with the Junior Circuit losing 7–1 at Veterans Stadium on July 13). But by then the Red Sox were mired in another slump, and only five days later on July 19, Johnson was fired in favor of third-base coach Don Zimmer after the team had lost eight of its last 11 games. At the time of his dismissal, Boston was out of contention with a 41–45 record, in fifth place and 13 games behind the Yankees. Johnson then briefly returned to scouting for the Red Sox.

Johnson was hired to become the first-ever manager of the expansion Seattle Mariners on September 3, 1976. Lou Gorman, Seattle's director of baseball operations, stated that Johnson would also assist in scouting players for the upcoming expansion draft.  Johnson said that he was looking for players with "pride, aggressiveness, and the right mental attitude." Johnson skippered the Mariners for approximately three and a half seasons until he was fired on August 3, and posted an overall win–loss mark of 226–362 (.384). 

Johnson then worked as third-base coach for the Texas Rangers, under Zimmer, starting in  before taking over as interim manager on July 30, 1982. Six years earlier, the roles had been reversed when third-base coach Zimmer succeeded Johnson as manager in Boston on July 18, 1976. In his final managerial role, Johnson's Rangers went 26–40 (.394) in the  season's final two months. He finished with a 472–590 record for a .444 career percentage as an American League skipper.

He then moved to the New York Mets as minor league coordinator of instruction and a longtime scout. He also served as the Mets' bench coach on the staff of Dallas Green from May 20, 1993, through the end of that season.

Johnson died from leukemia at the age of 75 in 2004 in Fairfield, California.

Managerial record

See also
 List of St. Louis Cardinals coaches

References

External links

Baseball-Reference.com – career managing record

New York Times Obituary

  

  

1928 births
2004 deaths
Baltimore Orioles coaches
Baltimore Orioles players
Baseball coaches from Nebraska
Baseball players from Nebraska
Boston Red Sox coaches
Boston Red Sox managers
Boston Red Sox scouts
Chicago White Sox players
Cincinnati Reds players
Deaths from cancer in California
Deaths from leukemia
Denver Bears players
Louisville Colonels (minor league) managers
Major League Baseball bench coaches
Major League Baseball bullpen coaches
Major League Baseball catchers
Major League Baseball pitching coaches
Major League Baseball third base coaches
Memphis Chickasaws players
New York Mets coaches
New York Mets scouts
New York Yankees players
New York Yankees scouts
Pawtucket Red Sox managers
People from Greeley County, Nebraska
Philadelphia Phillies players
Redding Browns players
Richmond Virginians (minor league) players
Rochester Red Wings managers
Rochester Red Wings players
St. Louis Browns players
St. Louis Cardinals coaches
St. Louis Cardinals players
San Antonio Missions players
Seattle Mariners managers
Texas Rangers coaches
Texas Rangers managers
Wichita Falls Spudders players